Eat at Whitey's is the third solo studio album by American recording artist Everlast. It was released on October 17, 2000 via Tommy Boy Records. The album's audio production was primarily handled by Dante Ross and John Gamble. According to AllMusic, the album continues from the folk rock style of Everlast's previous album, Whitey Ford Sings the Blues. It featured guest appearances from various musicians, such as Carlos Santana, B-Real, Rahzel, N'Dea Davenport, Cee-Lo Green, Warren Haynes, and Kurupt.

The album was both a commercial and critical success and has been certified gold by the Recording Industry Association of America a month after its release. It peaked at number 20 on the U.S. Billboard 200 chart with sales of 50,000 copies. The lead single of the record, "Black Jesus", peaked at number 15 on the Billboard Alternative Songs and number 30 on the Billboard Mainstream Rock.

Reception 

Eat at Whitey's received generally favorable reviews from critics. At Metacritic, which assigns a normalized rating out of 100 to reviews from mainstream publications, the album received an average score of 67, based on 16 reviews.

Stephen Thomas Erlewine of AllMusic stated: "Whenever Everlast lays back and spins stories and tall tales on his own, his blend of folk, rock, blues, rap, and pop culture clicks". In New York's Vulture.com, it said: "The rapper's nicotine-scarred voice does sound bluesy, and his raps are serious without being arch like Beck's. The album's sound -- a marriage of classical string arrangements and sparse drum beats -- makes the guitar stomp of his rap-rock peers seem more one-dimensional than ever. But Everlast's blues are one-shaded -- nothing on Eat at Whitey's approaches the grim fatalism of the Geto Boys' 'Mind Playing Tricks on Me', Eminem's 'Rock Bottom', or even Snoop Doggy Dogg's 'Murder Was the Case'."

Track listing

Notes
"Children's Story" is a cover song of "Children's Story" by Slick Rick

Personnel
Vocalists

Erik Francis Schrody - vocals
N'Dea Davenport - vocals (track 8), additional vocals (track 9)
Louis Freese - vocals (track 6)
Thomas Callaway - vocals (track 10)
Ricardo Brown - vocals (track 12)
Merry Clayton - additional vocals (tracks 2, 4, 11)
Bob Khalil - additional vocals (track 2)
Brendan Lynch - additional vocals (track 2)
Chris Thomas - additional vocals (track 2)
Kevin Dorsey - doowops (track 2)
James Gilstrap - doowops (track 2)
Dorian Holley - doowops (track 2)
Phillip Ingram - doowops (track 2)
Rahzel M. Brown - beatbox (track 7)

Instrumentalists

Erik Francis Schrody - guitar
Keith Ciancia - keyboards (also live), bass (track 2)
Carlos Santana - guitar (track 5)
Jack Daley - bass (tracks 5, 9, 11)
Victor Rice - bass (track 4)
Miles Tackett - cello (track 1)
Ben Boccardo - bass (track 8)
Chris Thomas - bass (track 10, also live)
Farid II Schater - bass (track 12)
Abdel Wahab - sitar (track 12)
John Bigham - guitar (live)
Larry Ciancia - drums (live)
Patrick Freitas - deejay (live)

Technicals

Erik Francis Schrody - producer (tracks 1-5, 7-11, 13), programming (tracks 11, 13), executive producer
Dante Ross - producer (tracks 1-5, 7-11, 13), programming, mixing, executive producer
John Gamble - producer (tracks 1-5, 7-11, 13), programming, mixing, recording
Daniel Alan Maman - producer (track 6)
Farid Nassar - producer (track 12)
Howie Weinberg - mastering
Jamie Staub - mixing
David Campbell - strings arrangement
Jay Nicholas - assistant engineer
Jason Tuminello - assistant engineer
John O'Mahony - assistant engineer
Noah Evans - assistant engineer

Additional

Andy VanDette - editor
Christian Lantry - photography
Carl Stubner - management
Corey Wagner - management

Charts

Certifications

References

2000 albums
Tommy Boy Records albums
Everlast (musician) albums
Albums produced by Fredwreck
Albums produced by Dante Ross
Albums produced by the Alchemist (musician)
Albums produced by John Gamble (record producer)